is a 2013 Japanese animated feature film directed by Keiichiro Kawaguchi. Released on December 27, 2013, it is the second film based on the Hunter × Hunter manga series created by Yoshihiro Togashi. Viz Media released the film on home video in North America on March 12, 2019.

Plot
The film begins before the plot of Hunter x Hunter,  some decades ago, when the chairman of the Hunters Association, Isaac Netero, defeats a powerful enemy known as Jed. Back to the present, a group of cloaked men storm into a prison and free the captives there, recruiting them for their plan. Some time later, Gon and Killua take a break from their expeditions with Kite to pay another visit at Heaven's Arena and cheer for their friend Zushi in the Battle Olympia Tournament with Wing and Biscuit. Meanwhile, Leorio, who is also bound to meet them, is attacked and knocked out by the cloaked men. Before the tournament begins, Gon and Killua pay a visit to Netero, who is also at the building, but the Arena is taken over by the mysterious men, with one of them, Gaki, replacing Zushi's first opponent and defeating him, another one, Shura, taking over the security system and a third one, Rengoku, stabbing herself and putting a curse on Netero to seal his Nen and immobilizing him. The ringleader then appears and knocks Gon and Killua down from the tower, but the duo manage to avoid the fall and return to the building, several floors below.

Netero recognizes the ringleader as Jed, and it is revealed that Jed was once Netero's friend and leader of "Shadow", the Hunter Association's black ops squad, that was destroyed by the chairman after they began to make use of "On", a cursed power that is opposite to Nen and is fueled by the user's pure hatred. Jed and his companions' objective is to force the Hunter Association to disclose the "Black Report", a record of the crimes against the descendants of "Shadow" to the public, that had peacefully settled after the organization was destroyed, but some time later were wrongly pursued and hunted down by the government, with three survivors, Gaki, Shura and Rengoku, to use their hatred to revive Jed, who taught them to use On. Meanwhile, Gon and Killua fight their way up the tower until Gaki appears to fight them, and Kurapika, who was present at the tournament to escort his employer, Neon, confronts Shura. Amidst the chaos, Leorio rises from the sewers inside the building and is helped by Hisoka, who also was inside the building to reunite with Kurapika. Once Gon and Killua defeat Geki, he self-destructs as his covenant states that losing to a Hunter will cost his life. Kurapika also defeats Shura with Leorio's help, but before dying, Shura infects Kurapika with Jed's blood, sealing his Nen and claiming that he will die unless he embraces On instead.

Once reunited with the others, Gon and Killua decide to confront Jed at the roof while Leorio stays behind to take care of Kurapika. In the occasion, Gon is also infected by his blood and decides to embrace On to keep fighting him, while Killua convinces Rengoku to give up on her hatred and she dies, freeing Netero from her curse. Netero confronts Jed, but instead of attacking him, he decides to defend all his attacks until the hatred on him subsides. Jed is ultimately defeated when Gon purifies the On in his body with his own Nen and does the same to him, allowing him to finally die in peace. After the remaining members of Shadow are defeated, Heaven's Arena returns to normal and the Battle Olympia Tournament is finally allowed to begin.

Cast
Ichirō Nagai / John Snyder as Isaac Netero
Megumi Han / Erica Mendez as Gon Freecss
Mariya Ise / Cristina Vee as Killua Zoldyck
Shidou Nakamura / Billy Kametz as Jed
Mizuki Yamamoto / Kimberley Anne Campbell as Rengoku
Hiroyuki Amano / Xander Mobus as Shura
Miyuki Sawashiro / Erika Harlacher as Kurapika
Keiji Fujiwara / Matthew Mercer as Leorio Paradinight
Yuka Terasaki / Kira Buckland as Zushi
Toshihiko Seki / Ezra Weisz as Wing
Kana Ueda / Faye Mata as Neon
Daisuke Namikawa / Keith Silverstein as Hisoka Morow
Chisa Yokoyama / Tara Sands as Biscuit Krueger
Ichitarō Ai / Tony Oliver as Beans
Miina Tominaga / Dorothy Fahn as Melody
Kotono Mitsuishi / Rachael Lillis as Cocco

Development
Hunter × Hunter: The Last Mission was announced on January 12, 2013 as a teaser trailer at the end of the first film, Hunter × Hunter: Phantom Rouge. In August, the release date and basic plot outline were given in the year's 37 issue of Weekly Shōnen Jump. The first trailer for the film was released over a week later. Like the previous film, music duo Yuzu provides the theme song, . A second full trailer was released in November. A novel adaptation of the film, written by Hajime Tanaka, was released on December 27, 2013.

Release
In the first ten days, the film earned ¥571 million ($5.47 million) at the Japanese box office. By its third week, the film earned ¥689,924,282 ($6,614,304). By the end of its run, the film grossed  at the Japanese box office.

The home video DVD of the film was released on July 23, 2014, selling 3,367 copies its first week for seventh place on Oricon's Japan Animation DVD chart. It sold 5,196 copies in four weeks before falling off the chart.

Like the first film, Hunter × Hunter: The Last Mission received its United States premiere at the Japan Film Festival of San Francisco on July 26, 2014.

At Anime NYC in November 2018, Viz Media announced that an English dub would screen in select United States theaters on January 30, 2019. They released the film on home video in North America on March 12, 2019.

References

External links
  

Last Mission, The
2013 anime films
Anime films based on manga
Nippon TV films
Japanese animated films
2010s Japanese-language films
Madhouse (company)
Viz Media anime